Tariel Shakrovych Vasadze (born October 15, 1947) is a Ukrainian businessman of Georgian descent, chairman and main shareholder of the UkrAVTO JSC and UkrAVTO Group. He was the chief executive of UkrAVTO since 1983, leading this once state-owned company through privatization and restructuring to a role of Ukraine's main automobile manufacturer, servicer and importer. Later Vasadze's business was diversified by entering the insurance market. His wealth was estimated in 2007 at being around US$ 780 million. But because car sales in Ukraine during 2009 fell by 72 percent his wealth was late 2010 estimated at US$230 million.

Career
Vasadze participates in Ukrainian politics, first as an advisor to Prime Minister Anatoliy Kinakh in 2002. Also in 2002 he was elected a member of the Verkhovna Rada (parliament) for For United Ukraine. Then he joined six factions and/or parliamentary groups: including the For United Ukraine faction, Labour Ukraine and Party of Industrialists and Entrepreneurs of Ukraine. His main and open political goal is to lobby the interests of automotive industry, particularly to protect and harmonize the business conditions for both the local manufacturers and the importers. In 2005 Vasadze became a member of Batkivschyna and thus part of the Yulia Tymoshenko Bloc (BYuT). During the 2006 and 2007 parliamentary elections, he was elected as a deputy to the Verkhovna Rada for this bloc. On December 2, 2010 Vasadze was excluded from the BYuT faction immediately after he voted for a new tax code as proposed by President Viktor Yanukovych. Early September 2011 Vasadze joined the Party of Regions faction. In 2012 he was re-elected into parliament on the party list of Party of Regions.

On January 16, 2014 he voted for the laws that conflict with Constitution of Ukraine, Convention about the protection of human rights and fundamental freedoms, obligations and duties of Ukraine as a member of the UNO, CE and OSCE.

In the 2014 Ukrainian parliamentary election Vasadze was placed 11th on the electoral list of Strong Ukraine. In the election Strong Ukraine failed to clear the 5% election threshold (it got 3.11% of the votes) thus Vasadze did not return to parliament.

Tariel Vasadze has been long-time-owner of a private business-jet aircraft. In early 2008 he received a Bombardier Challenger 605, serial number 5725, which was initially operated by Execujet wearing the registration D-ACUA. In 2011 the operation of this aircraft moved on to DC Aviation Germany. In 2013, Vasadze bought a factory-new Gulfstream G550, serial number 5409 and registered as D-AKAR, replacing the Challenger. Both the political unrest and economical downdraft in the Ukraine as well as coherent huge personal loss of money forced Vasadze to sell his aircraft only one year later by the end of 2014.

References

External links
 Vasadze's dossier entry at ProUA
 UkrAVTO JSC's dossier entry at ProUA
 UkrAVTO Group's dossier entry at ProUA

1947 births
Ukrainian businesspeople
People from Guria
Georgian emigrants to Ukraine
Naturalized citizens of Ukraine
Living people
Fourth convocation members of the Verkhovna Rada
Fifth convocation members of the Verkhovna Rada
Sixth convocation members of the Verkhovna Rada
Seventh convocation members of the Verkhovna Rada
Labour Ukraine politicians
Party of Industrialists and Entrepreneurs of Ukraine politicians
All-Ukrainian Union "Fatherland" politicians
Independent politicians in Ukraine
Party of Regions politicians
Ukrainian billionaires
Kiev National Transportation University alumni
Recipients of the Honorary Diploma of the Cabinet of Ministers of Ukraine
Automotive businesspeople